Wilmington High School was a public high school in Wilmington, Delaware.

Its mascot was the red devils.

It was the last traditional public high school in the Wilmington city limits.

History
It was established in 1872. Initially black children were not permitted to enroll at Wilmington High, and they were only allowed to go to Howard High School.

In the middle of the 20th century the school racially integrated. Initially there were conflicts. In 1960 it moved into its final building. Alumnus Dr. Pete Grandell of Elsmere stated that racial tensions evaporated by the 1960s. The school became mostly African-American by the 1970s.

After 1978 a desegregation order resulted in the Wilmington area being divided amongst several school districts. Wilmington High remained open as part of the Red Clay School District.

Eventually the student population decreased, resulting in its closure. It closed in 1999.

Student body
It had 1,069 students, 77% white and 22% black, in 1964.

It had 1,967 students, 71% black and 24% white, in 1973.

See also
 P. S. Dupont High School, another former traditional comprehensive high school in Wilmington

References

External links
 

Public high schools in Delaware
High schools in New Castle County, Delaware
Schools in Wilmington, Delaware
1872 establishments in Delaware
Educational institutions established in 1872
1999 disestablishments in Delaware
Educational institutions disestablished in 1999